Since her debut in All Star Comics #8 (October 1941), Diana Prince/Wonder Woman has appeared in a number of formats besides comic books. Genres include animated television shows, direct-to-DVD animated films, video games, the 1970s live action television series, Wonder Woman, the 2014 CGI theatrical releases of, The Lego Movie and The Lego Batman Movie, and the live-action DCEU films, Batman v Superman: Dawn of Justice (2016), Wonder Woman (2017), Justice League (2017), Wonder Woman 1984 (2020), and Zack Snyder's Justice League (2021). She is also slated to appear in future DCEU films such as Shazam! Fury of the Gods (2023) and The Flash (2023).

Live action

Television

Wonder Woman

Cathy Lee Crosby portrays the titular character in the 1974 film which drew heavily from the comic character's "I Ching" period. This version, intended as an ABC pilot, was not continued. Instead, ABC developed an adaptation closer to the character's superhero roots, with Lynda Carter in the role. This series ran for three seasons on ABC and CBS through the late 1970s.

Smallville

Although she doesn't appear, Wonder Woman is mentioned twice in the Smallville episodes "Warrior" and "Fortune".

Arrowverse

Diana Prince is mentioned in television series set in the Arrowverse. The first mention is in the second season of The Flash in the episode "Welcome to Earth-2" and later she is mentioned in Batwoman by Kate Kane in the episode "The Rabbit Hole".

Titans

Wonder Woman is mentioned several times in Titans by her sidekick Donna Troy.

Paradise Lost
In 2023 James Gunn announced a series focusing on the Amazons of Themyscira where Diana was raised, called Paradise Lost, as part of the new slate for DC's cinematic and television projects. The series will be set prior to the 2017 Wonder Woman film and has been described as focusing on political intrigue. It has yet to be announced if Diana herself will appear in the series.

Unbroadcast pilots
In 1967, William Dozier, producer/writer of the Adam West Batman TV series produced a five-minute short titled Who's Afraid of Diana Prince?, intended as a proof of concept for a potential Wonder Woman TV series. The short reimagines the concept as a fantasy sitcom, with Ellie Wood Walker as mousy, meek Diana Prince who, when she looks into a mirror, envisions herself as a comic-accurate rendition of Wonder Woman, played by Linda Harrison. The short ends with the revelation that Diana actually does have the power of flight. No series eventuated.

A pilot for a potential TV revival was produced in 2011. The pilot was written by David E. Kelley and Adrianne Palicki played Diana/Wonder Woman. As of 2021, the pilot has yet to be televised though a workprint without completed special effects has circulated for years.

Film

DC Extended Universe

Gal Gadot portrays Diana Prince in films set in the shared universe the DC Extended Universe, making her debut in the 2016 film Batman v Superman: Dawn of Justice (directed by Zack Snyder). Gadot reprises her role in her solo 2017 film Wonder Woman (directed by Patty Jenkins), Justice League (directed by Joss Whedon), and the latter film's director cut (directed by Zack Snyder). A sequel to Wonder Woman titled Wonder Woman 1984 (directed by Jenkins) was released in 2020. Wonder Woman made an appearance in the Peacemaker season finale episode "It's Cow or Never" portrayed by stand-in Kimberley Von Ilberg. Gadot made an uncredited cameo appearance in Shazam! Fury of the Gods. A third Wonder Woman was due to begin production with Patty Jenkins once again directing but was cancelled following the restructuring of DC Studios and Jenkins' departure.

Animation

Theatrical releases

The Lego Movie (2014)
Cobie Smulders provides the voice for Wonder Woman in The Lego Movie, a 2014 3D computer-animated adventure comedy film written for the screen and directed by Phil Lord and Christopher Miller from a story by them and Dan and Kevin Hageman. While the film features a few live-action scenes, it is primarily an animated film.

Wonder Woman reappeared briefly as a non-speaking character in follow-up The Lego Batman Movie (2017) and also makes a brief appearance in The Lego Movie 2: The Second Part (2019) with Smulders reprising her role.

DC Super Heroes vs. Eagle Talon (2017)
Rica Matsumoto provides the voice for Wonder Woman in DC Super Heroes vs. Eagle Talon.

Teen Titans Go! To the Movies (2018)
Halsey provides the voice for Wonder Woman in Teen Titans Go! To the Movies.

Space Jam: A New Legacy (2021)
Wonder Woman appears in Space Jam: A New Legacy, voiced by Rosario Dawson.

DC League of Super-Pets (2022)
Wonder Woman appears in DC League of Super-Pets, voiced by Jameela Jamil. This version of the character boasts a more muscular build and a more simplified outfit. At the end of the film, she becomes PB's owner.

Direct-to-DVD films
Justice League: The New Frontier (2008) – voiced by Lucy Lawless, the star of Xena: Warrior Princess.
Wonder Woman (2009) – voiced by Keri Russell. This film is loosely based on George Pérez's reboot of the character, specifically the "Gods and Mortals" arc that started the character's second volume in 1987.
Justice League: Crisis on Two Earths (2010) – voiced by Vanessa Marshall.
Superman/Batman: Apocalypse (2010) – voiced by Susan Eisenberg, who had previously voiced her in the DCAU. The film is based on the Superman/Batman: The Supergirl from Krypton storyline.
Justice League: Doom (2012) – voiced by Susan Eisenberg.
Lego Batman: The Movie - DC Super Heroes Unite (2013) – voiced by Laura Bailey.
Justice League: The Flashpoint Paradox (2013) – voiced by Vanessa Marshall.
JLA Adventures: Trapped in Time (2014) – voiced by Grey DeLisle.
Justice League: War (2014) – voiced by Michelle Monaghan. Her outfit is designed to resemble her outfit in the New 52.
Justice League: Throne of Atlantis (2015) – voiced by Rosario Dawson.
Lego DC Comics Super Heroes: Justice League vs. Bizarro League (2015) – voiced by Kari Wahlgren.
Justice League: Gods and Monsters (2015) – voiced by Tamara Taylor.
Justice League vs. Teen Titans (2016) – voiced by Rosario Dawson.
Justice League Dark (2017) – voiced by Rosario Dawson. It was released on Digital HD on January 24, 2017, and on DVD on February 7, 2017.
Despite not appearing in Suicide Squad: Hell to Pay, Wonder Woman was mentioned in a conversation between Scandal Savage and Knockout.
The Death of Superman (2018) – voiced by Rosario Dawson. In the movie, it has been hinted that she and Superman broke up some time ago even though they are still close friends.
Reign of the Supermen (2019) – voiced by Rosario Dawson.
Justice League vs. the Fatal Five (2019) – voiced by Susan Eisenberg.
Wonder Woman: Bloodlines (2019) – voiced by Rosario Dawson.
Superman: Red Son (2020) – voiced again by Vanessa Marshall.
Justice League Dark: Apokolips War (2020) – voiced by Rosario Dawson.
Justice Society: World War II (2021) – voiced by Stana Katic.
Injustice (2021) – voiced by Janet Varney.
Teen Titans Go! & DC Super Hero Girls: Mayhem in the Multiverse (2022) – voiced again by Grey Griffin.

Television

The Brady Kids (1972)
Wonder Woman's first televised appearance was as a guest in an episode of The Brady Kids cartoon series in 1972, entitled "It's All Greek to Me" (voiced by Jane Webb). The Brady kids meet Diana Prince/Wonder Woman and together they find themselves accidentally transported back to the time of the Ancient Olympic Games. The kids plan to compete in the marathon and beat the Greek athletes to qualify for the race. Wonder Woman convinces the kids to disqualify themselves, explaining that if they win the race they will change the course of history.
(Wonder Girl had already appeared in a series of Teen Titans cartoon shorts which was part of The Superman/Aquaman Hour of Adventure cartoon show in 1967.) Filmation was planning a "Wonder Woman" pilot among other DC related projects.

Super Friends (1973–1986)
Wonder Woman appeared in Super Friends, Hanna-Barbera's Saturday morning animated series. She was originally voiced by Shannon Farnon and later by Connie Caulfield in Super Friends: The Legendary Super Powers Show, followed by B.J. Ward in The Super Powers Team: Galactic Guardians.

Superman (1988)
Wonder Woman guest starred in the Superman episode, "Superman and Wonder Woman versus the Sorceress of Time", voiced by Mary McDonald-Lewis. This appearance was the first Post-Crisis animated version of Wonder Woman. Besides possessing the power of flight and no longer having either an invisible plane or high-heel boots, she had wavy hair more in line with George Pérez's Post-Crisis interpretation of her.

Wonder Woman and the Star Riders (1993)
In 1992, Mattel planned a line of toys for girls with Wonder Woman leading a new cast of four female characters. Two had been previously established: Dolphin in 1968 and Ice in 1988. The other two were new characters invented for the series. Solara had sun-based fire powers while Starlily had earth-based plant powers. "Wonder Woman and the Star Riders" had the subtitle "Sparkling super heroines!" They were to be pitted against the villainess Purrsia (who has animal control abilities) and her mount, Panthera.

An announcement for an accompanying animated series was made during the 1993 Toy Fair, however a pilot was never produced beyond character designs and storyboards. A few test samples for the toy line were developed, as well as a short comic book story which would have been packaged with the figures. A mini comic was distributed as a breakfast cereal premium. Artwork has since been published in Les Daniels' 2000 book, Wonder Woman: The Complete History. The cancelled toy designs were recycled as part of the Tenko and the Guardians of the Magic toy line.

All the Star Riders ride winged horses, and Wonder Woman herself rides a winged unicorn named Nightshine.

DCAU

DC Animated Universe (DCAU) refers to the shared universe centered on a group of animated television series based on DC Comics, produced by Warner Bros. Animation from the early 1990s to the mid-2000s; beginning with Batman: The Animated Series in 1992 and ending with Justice League Unlimited in 2006. Some parts of the associated media franchise including direct-to-video feature films and shorts, comic books, video games and other multimedia adaptations are also included in the continuity.

Justice League (2001–2004) and Justice League Unlimited (2004–2006)

Justice League was the first chance to add Wonder Woman (voiced by Susan Eisenberg) to the DCAU, as the rights had been previously tied up in possible movies and television series. To introduce her into a universe already populated by long-experienced heroes like Batman and Superman, Bruce Timm and his team took a cue from George Pérez's newcomer-to-man's-world Post-Crisis interpretation. This Diana started off completely innocent and ignorant of man's world (John Stewart calls her a "rookie"). As with the Pérez version, she neither keeps a secret identity nor has an invisible plane (although in the Justice League Unlimited first-season episode "For the Man Who Has Everything", she unveils the plane). Also in this series, her traditional bullet proof bracelet cuffs became bullet proof vambraces (i.e., forearm armor). However, perhaps as a nod to her Pre-Crisis appearance, she has straight hair and high-heeled boots suggestive of her old Super Friends incarnation. Also, her lasso did not compel truthfulness until the Justice League Unlimited episode "The Balance" in which Hippolyta activated her true power.

Her initial personality consisted of a strict adherence to Amazonian dogma (prompting some of her teammates, especially the more brash and headstrong Hawkgirl, to react to her attitude by calling her "Princess" somewhat disdainfully). Noticeable though is the effect of Man's World on Diana. Her first appearances are marked by her reflexively acting off of Amazonian ideology (in "Fury", she questions how necessary men really are), but as time passes, she becomes more interested in men (in particular, Batman, with whom she has a flirtatious and possibly romantic relationship) and experiences the emotional excesses of man's world, as compared to the Amazons (who are portrayed as somewhat stoic if not emotionally stunted). Batman's affections for Wonder Woman, however, are somewhat confirmed in the Unlimited episode "This Little Piggy", where he admits his feelings to Zatanna when requesting her help in changing Diana back (she was turned into a pig by Circe). Batman's and Wonder Woman's mutual feelings are implicated in the JLA episode "The Brave and the Bold", when Wonder Woman manages to stop a missile crashing into Gorilla City. When the weight of the missile head crushes her, Batman rushes to the site and attempts to clear the rubble while everyone else is too stunned by Wonder Woman's possible death to help. However, Wonder Woman is found unhurt, and when she sees Batman's gloves covered in dirt in his attempt to save her, she kisses him on the cheek. Batman and Wonder Woman share a kiss in the Justice League season finale "Starcrossed" (they kissed to hide their faces from Thanagarian patrol). In the episode "Kid's Stuff", Wonder Woman, in her eight-year-old form (voiced by Dakota Fanning), also flirts liberally with the young Batman, who acts as miniature version of his adult self, either ignoring or being embarrassed by her advances.

She finds joy but also discovers a temper that frequently needs to be checked by her teammates ("Hereafter", "Hawk and Dove", "Eclipsed", etc.). Later episodes dealt directly with her temper and Diana's eventual mastery of it. She since adopted the role of ambassador of the Amazons at her mother's request ("To Another Shore"), bringing another Post-Crisis trait to the DCAU.

While Wonder Woman's origin in the DCAU is not detailed, in the episode "The Balance", it is revealed that she indeed was a clay statue sculpted by Hippolyta and somehow brought to life. In the same episode, Hades says that he helped Hippolyta sculpt the clay statue that would eventually become Diana, making him feel almost like a father to her, but was banished before she was brought to life. That claim, however, was never substantiated (when Hawkgirl points out she could use the lasso on him, Diana says it doesn't matter). It was revealed that the Wonder Woman armor was originally made by the god Hephaestus for her mother, Queen Hippolyta, not Diana. However, in episodes, again like "The Balance", it was insinuated and implied that the armor was eventually made for her purposes and use. She had stolen her armor to use once Hippolyta forbade her to enter the outside world. Later in the series it is revealed that Diana did not know that the armor had additional abilities, which could be activated by pressing the star on the tiara.

Steve Trevor made an appearance in the first season's three-part finale, "The Savage Time", when the League time-travels back to World War II to stop Vandal Savage from changing history. In this story, Steve is an agent of the OSS, whom Diana falls in love with. They are separated when Diana goes to stop Savage's invasion of America and returns to the present day. In the episode's conclusion, she visits her friend, now a very old man, at a retirement community.

Wonder Woman's eventual fate is unknown, but Kobra mentions that she is still alive during the time of Batman Beyond. She was originally supposed to appear in the Batman Beyond episode "The Call", which featured a future Justice League. However, rights issues precluded the possibility and her cameo was instead taken by Big Barda. She returns in the Justice League Beyond 2.0 comic, which is set some years after the conclusion of the Batman Beyond series.

Her powers are almost the same as her comics counterpart, including flight and super strength, lending Wonder Woman the ability to hold out against Superman in a fight, while both were hallucinating. She has a weakness to pierce wounds as shown by Devil Ray's poisonous dart harming her. In "Grudge Match", she is able to singlehandedly defeat Vixen, Hawkgirl, Huntress and Black Canary in a no-holds barred fight.

South Park (2007)
In the Comedy Central animated series South Park, Wonder Woman plays a prominent role in the Imaginationland Trilogy, in which she is depicted as a member of the Council of Nine, consisting of the nine most revered of all imaginary characters. She along with Aslan, Gandalf, Glinda, Jesus, Luke Skywalker, Morpheus, Popeye and Zeus teach Butters to control his power of imagination to help defend their land against all the evil imaginary creatures created. This episode considered to be parody.

Batman: The Brave and the Bold (2008–2011)
In Batman: the Brave and the Bold, Wonder Woman makes a non-speaking cameo as a member of the Justice League in the episode "Sidekicks Assemble". She is only shown from behind and is not identified by name. At San Diego Comic-Con 2010's Batman: The Brave and the Bold panel, it was confirmed that Wonder Woman would appear in an upcoming episode of the show. Wonder Woman appears in the opening segment of the 2011 episode "Scorn of the Star Sapphire!" rescuing Steve Trevor from Baroness Paula Von Gunther. Her appearance is accompanied by an arrangement of the classic 1970s Wonder Woman theme song. She was voiced by Vicki Lewis, who also voiced Star Sapphire in the same episode. She subsequently appears in "Triumvirate of Terror!", where she teams up with Batman and Superman to fight the combined threat of Cheetah, Lex Luthor and the Joker.

Superman: Red Son (2009)
Wonder Woman appears in the Superman: Red Son motion comic, voiced by Wendee Lee.

Young Justice (2010–present)
Wonder Woman appears in the animated series Young Justice, voiced by Maggie Q. At New York Comic Con 2010, it was confirmed that there are no longer any restrictions involving DC characters appearing in animation, thus making it possible for Wonder Woman to be used. Wonder Woman appears in the pilot episode, "Independence Day", where she and the rest of the Justice League arrive at Cadmus Labs following its destruction. She is shown having a conversation with Superman about the fate of the newly discovered Superboy, though her words are not audible to the audience. She makes her first speaking appearance in the episode "Agendas", where she chastises Batman for recruiting Robin at such a young age and tries to have Captain Marvel thrown out of the League for lying about his age. Alongside the rest of the League, she is brainwashed by Vandal Savage's Starro spores in the closing moments of "Usual Suspects". In the season one finale, "Auld Acquaintance", she battles the members of Young Justice at Savage's behest before being trapped in an impenetrable force-field created by Rocket. She is presumably freed from Savage's control along with the rest of the League. In Young Justice: Invasion, which is set five years after season 1, Wonder Woman has taken on Cassie Sandsmark as her sidekick. She leaves Earth along with several other Leaguers in the episode "Alienated", to stand trial for crimes the team committed while under Savage's control. In Young Justice: Outsiders, two years later, Wonder Woman has become co-chair of the League alongside Aqualad, the new Aquaman, and is currently leading a group of Leaguers in space seeking to redeem the League's reputation against the forces of the Apokolips and the Light. She secretly keeps in contact with Batman, Nightwing, Oracle, Miss Martian and Aquaman, who are coordinating several teams in secret, and thus fears they are crossing the line.

Mad (2012–13)
For a sketch on the Mad series, when their fellow heroes feel under-appreciated, they appeal to Superman, Batman, and Wonder Woman about being called "Super Friends".

DC Nation Shorts (2012–2014)
Wonder Woman appears in one of the DC Nation Shorts on Cartoon Network, voiced by Susan Eisenberg.

Lego DC Comics: Batman Be-Leaguered (2014) 
Wonder Woman appears in the animated television special Lego DC Comics: Batman Be-Leaguered, voiced by Grey DeLisle (reprising the role from JLA Adventures: Trapped in Time).

Justice League Action (2016–2018)
Wonder Woman appears as one of the three lead characters in Justice League Action, voiced by Rachel Kimsey. This incarnation has started dating Superman in the episode "Repulse!" but the two decide to keep it secret from the other members of the Justice League.

DC Super Hero Girls (2019–present)
Wonder Woman appears as a central protagonist in the DC Super Hero Girls TV series, voiced again by Grey Griffin, this time with a Mediterranean accent. In this version, she is 317 years old and has sneaked away from the Amazons' island home of Themyscira to fulfill her dream of protecting the mortal world. Upon reaching the city of Metropolis, she learns to pass herself off as a typical high school student with help from the other main characters. Whenever she is around Steve Trevor, the first boy she had ever seen, she becomes extremely shy and clumsy.

Scooby-Doo and Guess Who? (2019)
Wonder Woman appears in the Scooby-Doo and Guess Who? episode "The Scooby of a Thousand Faces" with Rachel Kimsey reprising her role from Justice League Action. She teams up with Mystery Inc. when they are in Greece and contend with a Minotaur attacking a museum which Wonder Woman thinks is a real Minotaur that was sent by Hades. A running gag has Mystery Inc. trying to prove that the Minotaur is a fake. While Wonder Woman does train Daphne and Velma, she leaves Shaggy and Fred out of the training. Scooby-Doo takes a liking to her. Eventually, Wonder Woman was able to train Shaggy and Fred when it comes to trapping the Minotaur. When the Minotaur was trapped, Mystery Inc. unmasks it to be the museum curator. Wonder Woman's Lasso of Truth breaks the Minotaur costume as the curator states that he was after the Golden Head of Apollo so that he can sell it and retire. After the curator is handed over to the police, Wonder Woman heads back to Themyscira as she encourages Mystery Inc. to continue their mystery-solving activities.

Harley Quinn (2019)
Wonder Woman appears in the DC Universe series Harley Quinn, voiced again by Vanessa Marshall. Debuting in "So, You Need a Crew?", she appears on the news battling Doctor Psycho, and is stunned, along with everybody else, when Psycho calls her the "C-word". She later makes several minor appearances in the series alongside other members of the Justice League.

Upcoming animated series 
In March 2023, DC Studios co-CEO James Gunn revealed that a Wonder Woman animated series is in development.

Video games
 Justice League Task Force (1995), based on the comic series as a playable character
 Justice League: Injustice for All (2002), based on the Justice League animated series as a playable character.
 Justice League: Chronicles (2003), based on the Justice League animated series as a playable character.
 Justice League Heroes (2006), as a playable character, voiced by Courtenay Taylor.
 Justice League Heroes: The Flash (2006), as an NPC.
 Mortal Kombat vs. DC Universe (2008), as a playable character — voiced by Tara Platt.
 DC Universe Online (2011), as a playable character originally voiced by Gina Torres, currently voiced by Susan Eisenberg.
 LittleBigPlanet 2 (2011), as an NPC — voiced by Jules de Jongh.
 Scribblenauts Unmasked: A DC Comics Adventure (2013), as a summonable character
 Infinite Crisis (2015), as a playable character — voiced by Vanessa Marshall.
 Arena of Valor (2016), as a playable character.
 Fortnite (2017), as a cosmetic outfit.
 DC Unchained (2018), as a playable character.
 DC Super Hero Girls: Teen Power (2021), as a playable character — voiced by Grey DeLisle
 MultiVersus (2022), as a playable character — voiced by Abby Trott.
Suicide Squad: Kill the Justice League (2023), as an NPC.
Wonder Woman is currently getting a single-player open world game developed by Monolith in which she will star in. The game was announced at the 2021 Game Awards

Lego
 Lego Batman 2: DC Super Heroes (2012), as a playable character — voiced by Laura Bailey.
 Lego Batman 3: Beyond Gotham (2014), as a playable character — voiced by Laura Bailey reprising her role. If the player chooses to activate her flying ability, the theme song from the Wonder Woman television series will play until she lands.
 Lego Dimensions (2015), as a playable character — voiced by Laura Bailey.
 Lego DC Super-Villains (2018), as a playable character — with Susan Eisenberg reprising her role from the Justice League animated series.

Injustice
 Injustice: Gods Among Us (2013) as a playable character — voiced by Susan Eisenberg. The storyline sees Wonder Woman travelling to an alternate reality with the rest of the Justice League where they must defeat most of their evil counterparts. Wonder Woman's counterpart supports the tyrannical Superman's regime and is in a relationship with him (though it is evidently one-sided, as he still loves his deceased wife Lois). In the game, she has alternate costumes based on her appearances in Flashpoint, Red Son, the New 52, Ame-Comi girls, and issue #600 of the Wonder Woman comics.
 Injustice 2 (2017), as a playable character, — voiced by Susan Eisenberg. This version is still allied with the Regime and Superman, and tries to convince Supergirl (who assisted her in breaking out of prison) to join their cause, but fails after Supergirl learns that the Regime shows no mercy towards criminals. In her single player ending, Wonder Woman takes Brainiac's head, gaining the public favor needed to restore the Regime to power. She plans to make Batman and his comrades pay for toppling the Regime, then take her revenge on the Themyscirans for betraying her. An alternate version of her Flashpoint counterpart appears in Green Arrow's ending as a member of the Multiverse Justice League. She has a gear set in the game based on the 2017 Wonder Woman film.

Music
Music about or that references Wonder Woman:
 2007: "Wonder Woman" by Trey Songz
 2011: "Wonder Woman" by Sarah Lichtenberg featuring Ashley Carroll
 2017: "Wonder Woman" by JoJo
 2018: "Wonder Woman" by Kacey Musgraves
 2018: "Wonder Woman" by Davido
 2019: "Salt" by Ava Max
 2020: "Wonder Woman" by Louise

Books
 Wonder Woman: The Complete History by Les Daniels (2000) 
 Wonder Woman: The Ultimate Guide to the Amazon Princess by Scott Beatty (2003) 
 Wonder Woman: Mythos by Carol Lay (2003) 
 Wonder Woman: Amazon Princess by Nina Jaffe (2004) 
 Wonder Woman: The Arrival by Nina Jaffe (2004) 
 Wonder Woman: The Contest by Nina Jaffe (2004) 
 Wonder Woman: The Journey Begins by Nina Jaffe (2004) 
 Wonder Woman: The Rain Forest by Nina Jaffe (2004) 
 Wonder Woman: I Am Wonder Woman by Nina Jaffe (2004) 
 Wonder Woman's Book of Myths by Clare Hibbert (2004) 
 What Would Wonder Woman Do?: An Amazon's Guide to the Working World by Suzan Colon & Jennifer Traig (2007)

Trade paperbacks

Pre-Crisis stories
Collected stories from All Star Comics, Sensation Comics and Wonder Woman (Volume 1):
 Wonder Woman Archives Volume 1 by William Moulton Marston (1998) 
 Wonder Woman Archives Volume 2 by William Moulton Marston (2000) 
 Wonder Woman Archives Volume 3 by William Moulton Marston (2002) 
 Wonder Woman Archives Volume 4 by William Moulton Marston (2004)

Post-Crisis stories
The second Wonder Woman series (1986-2006) is collected in several trade paperbacks:
 Gods and Mortals: Wonder Woman #1—7 by George Pérez 
 Challenge of the Gods: Wonder Woman #7—14 by George Pérez 
 Beauty and the Beasts: Wonder Woman #15—19 and Action Comics #600 by George Pérez 
 Destiny Calling: Wonder Woman #20—24 and Annual #1 by George Pérez 
 The Contest: Wonder Woman #90—93 and #0 by William Messner-Loebs 
 The Challenge of Artemis: Wonder Woman #94—100 by William Messner-Loebs .
 Second Genesis: Wonder Woman #101—105 by John Byrne 
 Lifelines: Wonder Woman #106—112 by John Byrne 
 Paradise Lost: Wonder Woman #164—170 and Wonder Woman Secret Files and Origins #2 by Phil Jimenez 
 Paradise Found: Wonder Woman #171—177 and Wonder Woman Secret Files and Origins #3 by Phil Jimenez 
 Down to Earth: Wonder Woman #195—200 by Greg Rucka 
 Bitter Rivals: Wonder Woman #201—205 by Greg Rucka 
 Eyes of the Gorgon: Wonder Woman #206—213 by Greg Rucka 
 Land of the Dead: Wonder Woman #214—217 and The Flash #219 by Greg Rucka 
 Mission's End: Wonder Woman #218—226 by Greg Rucka 

The third Wonder Woman series (2006-2011) is collected in several trade paperbacks:
 Who Is Wonder Woman?: Wonder Woman #1—4 by Allan Heinberg (2008) 
 Love and Murder: Wonder Woman #6—10 by Jodi Picoult (2008) 
 The Circle: Wonder Woman #14—19 by Gail Simone (2008) 
  Ends of the Earth: Wonder Woman #20-25 by Gail Simone (2009) 
 Rise of the Olympian: Wonder Woman #26-33 by Gail Simone (2009) 
 Warkiller: Wonder Woman #34-39 by Gail Simone (2010) 
 Contagion: Wonder Woman #40-44 by Gail Simone (2010)

Specials, one-shots and other collections
 The Once and Future Story: A tale about spousal abuse by Trina Robbins (1998) 
 Wonder Woman: Spirit of Truth by Paul Dini (2001) 
 Wonder Woman: The Hiketeia Wonder Woman vs. Batman by Greg Rucka (2002) 
 Amazons Attack! by Pete Woods (2007) 
 JLA: A League of One: Wonder Woman must take down the JLA to save them from a deadly prophecy by Christopher Moeller (2002) 
 JLA: Golden Perfect: Collects JLA #61-65 by Joe Kelly (2003)

Fine arts
In the fine arts, and starting with the Pop Art period and on a continuing basis since the 1960s, the character has been depicted by multiple visual artists and incorporated into contemporary artwork, most notably by Andy Warhol, Roy Lichtenstein, Mel Ramos, Dulce Pinzon, and others.

Other
May 1, 1944 - December 1, 1945, there was a daily comic strip, written by Wonder Woman creator Charles Moulton and drawn by H. G. Peter. The strip was distributed by King Features Syndicate. The complete strip is available in a collection published by IDW.
DC Super Hero Girls, web series, voiced by Grey DeLisle.

References

 
Mass media franchises introduced in 1941